The Achepabanca River Northeast is a tributary of the Achepabanca River, flowing into the northeastern part of Senneterre within La Vallée-de-l'Or Regional County Municipality (RCM), in the administrative region of Abitibi-Témiscamingue, in Quebec, in Canada.

The course of the river successively crosses the townships of Maricourt and Berthelot. Its confluence is at the limit of the townships Girouard and Berthelot.

The Northeastern Achepabanca River runs entirely on forest land on the west side of the Gouin Reservoir. Forestry is the main economic activity of this hydrographic slope; recreational tourism activities, second. The surface of the river is usually frozen from the beginning of December to the end of April. The hydrographic slope of the Northeastern Achepabanca River is served by the R0808 forest road which passes on the north side.

Geography

Toponymy
The toponym "Northeastern Achepabanca River" was formalized on December 5, 1968, at the Commission de toponymie du Québec.

See also

References

External links 

Jamésie
La Vallée-de-l’Or
Rivers of Abitibi-Témiscamingue
Nottaway River drainage basin